Baron Wakehurst, of Ardingly in the County of Sussex, is a title in the Peerage of the United Kingdom. It was created on 29 June 1934 for the Conservative politician Gerald Loder, fifth son of Sir Robert Loder, 1st Baronet (see Loder Baronets for earlier history of the family). He had previously represented Brighton in the House of Commons and was the creator of Wakehurst Place Gardens in Ardingly, West Sussex. His only son, the second Baron, was also a Conservative politician and served as Governor of New South Wales and later as Governor of Northern Ireland. The third baron, who was known by his middle name Christopher, was a barrister and businessman: he died in July 2022.  the title is held by the latter's son Timothy, the fourth Baron, who succeeded his father in that year.

Barons Wakehurst (1934)
 Gerald Walter Erskine Loder, 1st Baron Wakehurst (1861–1936)
 John de Vere Loder, 2nd Baron Wakehurst (1895–1970)
 John Christopher Loder, 3rd Baron Wakehurst (1925–2022)
 Timothy Walter Loder, 4th Baron Wakehurst (b. 1958)

The heir presumptive is the current holder's cousin, John James Loder (b. 1977).

See also
 Loder Baronets, of Whittlebury and of High Beeches
 Wakehurst Place, formerly owned by the first Lord Wakehurst

Notes

References
 Kidd, Charles, Williamson, David (editors). Debrett's Peerage and Baronetage (1990 edition). New York: St Martin's Press, 1990, 
 

Baronies in the Peerage of the United Kingdom
1934 establishments in the United Kingdom
Noble titles created in 1934
Noble titles created for UK MPs